Marley Aké (born 5 January 2001) is a French professional footballer who plays as winger for  club Dijon on loan from the Italian club Juventus.

Club career

Marseille
On 29 June 2019, Aké signed his first professional contract with Marseille. He made his professional debut with in a 1–1 Ligue 1 draw with Rennes on 29 September 2019.

Juventus

2020–present: Juventus U23 spell and debut for the first team 
On 28 January 2021, Aké joined Serie A side Juventus on a four-and-a-half-year contract, in a deal worth €8 million, with Franco Tongya moving to Marseille for the same fee. Aké was integrated into Juventus' reserve team, Juventus U23. He made his debut on 31 January, coming on as a substitute in a league game against Giana Erminio.

Aké's first goal came on 3 March, scoring in the last touch of the game to help Juventus U23 beat rivals Novara 2–1. On 12 September, Aké missed a penalty in the 14th minute in a 1–0 defeat against Pro Patria. On 20 November, Aké scored a brace in a 2–1 win against Fiorenzuola.

On 26 February 2021, he was first called up by the first team for a Serie A match against Hellas Verona. On 18 January 2022, Aké debuted for the first team in a 4–1 Coppa Italia win against Sampdoria coming on as substitute in the 75th minute; one minute later, he won a penalty scored by Álvaro Morata after being fouled by Tommaso Augello. On 13 February, Aké made his Serie A debut coming on as substitute in the 86th minute in match drawn 1–1 against Atalanta. On 2 March, Aké played his first match as a starter with Juventus in a 1–0 Coppa Italia away win against Fiorentina in which he was substituted after the half time by Juan Cuadrado.

On 1 August 2022, Juventus announced that Aké would be sidelined for two months after he had injured his fibula during a tournée in the United States.

Loan to Dijon
On 31 January 2023, Aké joined Dijon in French Ligue 2 on loan for the rest of the season.

Style of play 
Aké is a right-footed winger who can play in both sides but prefers playing on the left wing. Aké has good technique, speed and dribbling. Aké has also played as an attacking winger and as a full-back.

Personal life
Born in France, Aké is of Ivorian descent.

Career statistics

Club

Honours 
Juventus
 Supercoppa Italiana runners-up: 2021

References

Notelist

External links
 France profile  at FFF
 
 

2001 births
Living people
Sportspeople from Béziers
Footballers from Occitania (administrative region)
French footballers
France youth international footballers
French sportspeople of Ivorian descent
Black French sportspeople
Association football wingers
RCO Agde players
Montpellier HSC players
AS Béziers (2007) players
Olympique de Marseille players
Juventus F.C. players
Juventus Next Gen players
Dijon FCO players
Championnat National 2 players
Ligue 1 players
Serie C players
French expatriate footballers
Expatriate footballers in Italy
French expatriate sportspeople in Italy